STOWA is a German luxury watchmaker founded by Walter Storz in 1927, and is based in Engelsbrand, Germany. The name is a portmanteau of the founder's name,  Storz  Walter.  From 1996 until 2021, STOWA was by Jörg Schauer, who also owns the Schauer watch brand and the DUROWE watch movement brand.  July 1, 2021, Stowa became part of Tempus Arte GmbH & Co. KG, which also owns Uhrenmanufaktur Lang & Heyne Dresden, UhrenWerke-Dresden (UWD), as well as the Munich-based company Leinfelder Uhren München.

Timeline

1927: Founding of STOWA by Walter Storz in Hornberg/Kinzigtal, Germany. The name derives from "STO," for Storz and "WA," for Walter.

1935: Moved to a new rented building in Pforzheim, Germany.

1938: Construction of STOWA owned building at Bismarckstraße 54 in Pforzheim, Germany.

1938: Presentation of Bauhaus watches (on which today's Antea line is based).

1938: AbwehrZeitArbeit ausf.b developed to manufacture timepieces for the military.

1939: Production launch of STOWA Marine Beobachtungsuhr ("Observation Watch") and the big pilot B-watches (55mm), (commissioned by the Luftwaffe in World War II). Both basic designs can be found in several variations within the current line. STOWA was one of only five manufacturers for these watches (the others being A. Lange & Söhne, Laco, Wempe and IWC).

1945: On February 23, 1945, the STOWA building is destroyed by the Allies' bombardment of Pforzheim.

1945: Start of STOWA's new watch factory in Rheinfelden, Baden-Württemberg, Germany, near Basel, Switzerland.

1947: Walter Storz becomes founding member of the Watch Industry Association.

1951: Construction of STOWA's new factory in Rheinfelden is completed. The headquarters office in Pforzheim is rebuilt in parallel.

1954: Foundation of the RUFA (Rheinfelder Uhrteilefabrik). Leads to production of RUFA-Anti-Shocks for PUW and DUROWE movements. The Rheinfelden factory is expanded.

1960: Werner Storz, son of Walter Storz, joins the company and is in charge of sales overseas.

1963: Protection of trademarks for STOWA Seatime is established (prototype for present-day Seatime collection).

1966: The Rheinfelden factory is expanded further.

1970: STOWA launches the "smallest alarm clock of the world" at the Hannover watch fair. The watch collection comprises approximately 1,000 different watch models.

1974: Walter Storz dies. STOWA becomes partner and member of the German watch cooperation Pallas, which has the primary goal of supplying specialized dealers and retailers with a collection of market-conform and trend-setting watches, concentrated advertising, and the highest level of customer service.

1996: Jörg Schauer takes over STOWA and all trademark rights from Werner Storz.

1997: STOWA's 70th anniversary. A limited edition Fliegeruhr ("Pilot Watch") with Unitas 6300N movement is introduced.

1998: Werner Storz dies.

2002: The 75th anniversary of STOWA as a company. A limited edition Fliegeruhr "Bremen D 1167" is offered in celebration of the anniversary. This limited edition is a tribute to the airplane called "Bremen," the first airplane to make a nonstop flight across Atlantic Ocean from East to West in 1928.

2007: STOWA's 80th anniversary. Introduction of two limited edition pilot's watches: Flieger Automatic and Flieger Original.

2008/2009: Move to the current production building, which also houses the STOWA in-house museum with several historic watches produced by STOWA.

2010: Introduction of the STOWA Chronograph, which is based on a former pocket watch design. Launch of the Flieger Baumuster B with B-Dial. (Only 42 pieces of the original 55mm Pilot B-Dial watch have been produced during WW2, making the original Pilot B-Uhr is one of the rarest big pilot watches ever.)

2021:  Stowa became part of Tempus Arte GmbH & Co. KG.

Watch models

As of 2020, STOWA has several model lines:
 Antea: Replica of an original STOWA design from the 1930s.
 Antea back to bauhaus: Refreshed bauhaus design, in collaboration with designer Hartmut Esslinger, introduced in 2014.
 Chronograph: Chronograph models based on historic pocket watch designs.
 Flieger (Pilot): Homage to the original Beobachtungsuhren (B-Uhr) design.
 Flieger Verus: Contemporary pilot watch designs.
 Marine: Based on the marine chronometers used in navigation.
 Partitio: a Bauhaus design inspired watch, replicated from a 1930S STOWA design, and sold exclusively through Manufactum retail stores.
 Prodiver/Seatime: Sports diving watches that are water resistant to 1000m/300m. The dial and hand design of these are inspired by vintage STOWA Seatimes.
 Schauer: More upscale watches designed by Jörg Schauer

The movements in STOWA's watches are mostly ETA movements with significant decoration and, in the case of the Airman Original, mechanical modifications. Since Jörg Schauer owns the DUROWE (Deutsche Uhrenrohwerke) movement brand, it is anticipated that Durowe movements will be used in STOWA watches in the future.

Distribution
Since around 2001/02, STOWA has sold the majority of its watches directly to the customer, through its website or from its factory in Engelsbrand. STOWA claims this allows them to keep their distribution costs down, thereby keeping prices lower than if their watches were sold through a wholesale & retail network.
Manufactum stores sell a range of Stowa watches with one model, the Partitio, available exclusively.

See also
 List of German watch manufacturers

References

External links
 Official STOWA website
 Official STOWA discussion forum

Watch brands
Watch manufacturing companies of Germany
Companies based in Baden-Württemberg
Manufacturing companies established in 1927
1927 establishments in Germany
Privately held companies of Germany
German brands